South Korean singer an actress Park Ji-yeon has performed in multiple concerts an festivals since 2009. Her first appearance on stage was in May 2009 perfroming her collaboration song "Women's Generation" with Davichi and Seeya.

Fanmeetings

Award Shows

Festivals

Joint Concerts & Tours

TV Shows & Specials

References 

Park Ji-yeon